Dobrovelychkivka is an urban-type settlement in Novoukrainka Raion, Kirovohrad Oblast in southern Ukraine. Dobrovelychkivka hosts the administration of Dobrovelychkivka settlement hromada, one of the hromadas of Ukraine. The population of the settlement is  

Dobrovelychkivka was occupied by the Nazis on 1 August 1941 during World War II. Jewish homes were soon registered and marked with Stars of David. In late December 1941, all Jews from the town were taken to the village of Maryevka and shot to death. Dobrovelychkivka was liberated by the Red Army on 17 March 1944.

Until 18 July 2020, Dobrovelychkivka was the administrative center of Dobrovelychkivka Raion. The raion was abolished in July 2020 as part of the administrative reform of Ukraine, which reduced the number of raions of Kirovohrad Oblast to four. The area of Dobrovelychkivka Raion was merged into Novoukrainka Raion.

It hosts a regional bazaar on Wednesday and Friday mornings, and is noted for being the purported geographical center of Ukraine.

References

Urban-type settlements in Novoukrainka Raion
Yelisavetgradsky Uyezd